Bismarck Normu Kuyon (1939-2014) was a Liberian politician and educator. He was a legislator in the 1970s, and would return to politics during the First Liberian Civil War. In 1993 we was chosen by the warring factions to become the head of the executive of the Liberian National Transitional Government (LNTG), but his nomination was withdrawn before the LNTG was installed.

Early life and career
Kuyon was born on September 15, 1939, in Gbarnga. He belonged to the Kpelle people. He attended school in his hometown of Gbarnga. Kuyon obtained a B.Sc. degree in agriculture from the Cuttington University College in Suacoco 1962. He worked as an agricultural extension agent at the Ministry of Agriculture 1962–1963. In 1965 he obtained a M.Sc. degree in General Science from Iowa State University in the United States. 1965-1968 he served as Director of Aquaculture at the Ministry of Agriculture. Between 1968 and 1975 he served as principal of the United Methodist Church school in Gbarnga, the Tubman Elementary and Junior High School. He studied Law through apprenticeship system, and he was admitted to the Bar in 1971.

Legislator
Kuyon was elected to the House of Representatives in the 1975 Liberian general election from Bong County. In the same year he was named president and Manager of the Bong County Cooperative. He was a member of the Deshield Commission on National Unity, which was mandated by the legislature to review national symbols (flag, anthem, national motto, constitution) to ensure inclusiveness. In the House of Representatives, he was the chairman of the House Committee on Education.

1980s
In the 1980s he served as Acting President of the College of West Africa (He would later serve of the Board of Trustees of Cuttington University and the College of West Africa). He worked with the Peace Corps programmes in Liberia in different roles.

Civil war years
In 1990 Kuyon re-entered politics. He became a member of the Interim Legislative Assembly, the parliament linked to the Interim Government of National Unity (IGNU) active during the First Liberian Civil War. He would become of the speaker of the Interim Legislative Assembly. On August 16, 1993, in the wake of the Cotonou Peace Accord, Liberian factions voted Kuyon as the chairman of the Council of State which was to serve as a collective executive branch of the Liberia National Transitional Government (LNTG) until elections could be held. Kuyon was nominated by IGNU, one of the three signatories of the Cotonou Peace Accord. However, Kuyon was removed from the post as Council of State chairman before the LNTG was installed. Kuyon had developed differences with the IGNU President Amos Sawyer over the management of disarmament of the warring factions. ON November 13, 1993 he was replaced on the Council of State by Philip A. Z. Banks, III. During the 1997 Liberian general election, he belonged to the Unity Party.

Later period
He was founding chairman of the Bong County Emergency Organization. Active in religious activities, he was Methodist conference lay-leader emeritus. Kuyon received the Humane Order of African Redemption, with the grade of Knight Great Band.

Kuyon died in 2014 and was buried in Gbarnga.

References

1939 births
2014 deaths
People from Bong County
Liberian United Methodists
True Whig Party politicians
Unity Party (Liberia) politicians
Members of the House of Representatives of Liberia
Iowa State University alumni